Brasilia
The following is a list of military bases in Brazil, sorted by location:

Air Force

Air Force Bases

Testing and Training Range

Navy

Naval Bases and Stations

Naval Air Base

Brazil
military